Needler is a surname. Notable people with the surname include:

Alfred Needler (1906–1998), Canadian scientist and diplomat
Christopher Needler (born 1944), British businessman
Henry Needler (1685–1760), British musician
Winifred Needler (1904–1987), Canadian Egyptologist